Behentrimonium chloride, also known as docosyltrimethylammonium chloride or BTAC-228, is a yellow waxlike organic compound with chemical formula , used as an antistatic agent and, sometimes, a disinfectant.  It is commonly found in cosmetics such as conditioners, hair dye, and mousse, and also in detergents. Laboratory tests have indicated that it does not readily biodegrade.

See also
Cetrimonium chloride – an C19 structural analogue
Cetrimonium bromide – an C19 structural analogue

References

External links
Behentrimonium chloride at the Household Products Database

Cosmetics chemicals
Disinfectants
Water treatment
Antistatic agents
Chlorides
Cationic surfactants
Quaternary ammonium compounds